SS Harold T. Andrews was a Liberty ship built in the United States during World War II. She was named after Harold T. Andrews, an ordinary seaman serving on  that, on 15 September 1942, in Suez, Egypt, saved an engineer that was trapped in the forepeak tank. He was posthumously awarded with the Merchant Marine Distinguished Service Medal.

Construction
Harold T. Andrews was laid down on 15 November 1943, under a Maritime Commission (MARCOM) contract, MC hull 1544, by J.A. Jones Construction, Panama City, Florida; she was launched on 28 December 1943.

History
She was allocated to Boland & Cornelius, on 19 February 1944. On 10 July 1946, she was laid up in the National Defense Reserve Fleet, in Mobile, Alabama. On 11 May 1949, she was sold to Astra Steamship Corp., for commercial use. She was withdrawn from the fleet on 13 May 1949.

References

Bibliography

 
 
 
 
 

 

Liberty ships
Ships built in Panama City, Florida
1944 ships
Mobile Reserve Fleet